YouPorn is a free pornographic video sharing website that launched in August of 2006.

Ownership
YouPorn's own site reports that its owner is Midstream Media International N.V., seated in Willemstad, the capital city of Curaçao, an island in the southern Caribbean Sea that forms a constituent country of the Kingdom of the Netherlands. Sunny Freeman, a reporter pursuing a graduate degree in journalism at UBC, wrote one article in The Tyee calling the company "German-based". The site is run from a hosting service in Texas.

In 2011, YouPorn was purchased by the adult entertainment and IT company Manwin, owners of other popular pornographic websites such as Pornhub and SpankWire based in Luxembourg.

Bandwidth
As of 2012, ExtremeTech reported YouPorn transferred an average of 950 TB per day, up from a reported figure of 3 TB per day in 2006.

Response
Concerns have surfaced over the inability to verify the age of the persons depicted in the videos, the possibility of copyrighted videos being uploaded to the site, and the possibility of privacy violations when private sex tapes are uploaded without the consent of all involved parties. In 2007 Vivid Entertainment took legal action against YouPorn, claiming that the streaming of copyrighted material was depriving it of revenue.

YouPorn has been called "a good role model for the sexually naive", as many of its homemade videos depict amateur couples having ordinary sex (known as "Amateur"), as opposed to the often unreal scenarios of commercial porn.

Data breaches 
In February 2012, the site was hacked, with the details of over 1 million users leaked onto the Internet. MindGeek blamed this on the failings of a third-party chat service.

Blocking

Germany
German law does not allow hardcore pornography without an effective age verification system, and the German Bundesprüfstelle für jugendgefährdende Medien (Federal Department for Media Harmful to Young Persons) placed YouPorn on its index. As a result, since April 2007, the German site of the Google search engine (google.de) classified YouPorn.com as a hardcore pornography website and replaced it with a link to Chilling Effects, claiming that a "German regulatory body reported illegal material".

Following a request by Kirchberg, the owner of a competing pornography service (now defunct), German provider Arcor categorized YouPorn and a few other porn sites as hardcore pornographic and also blocked access to the website at the routing level in September 2007, affecting over 2 million users. The German Pirate Party promptly opened a proxy server so that Arcor customers could continue to easily access YouPorn.

Arcor lifted the block on September 17 because the IP address-based filter which had been set up for YouPorn adversely affected other sites. Kirchberg then sued, alleging that Arcor aided unfair competition by YouPorn, and on October 19, 2007 obtained a temporary injunction ordering Arcor to resume limiting the accessibility to YouPorn.com. On October 23, 2007, Arcor started to control access to YouPorn again, this time with a DNS-based approach that is easily circumvented, and successfully filed an appeal against the injunction.

Kirchberg has sent notices to 19 German ISPs demanding that YouPorn be granted access limitations, but none have complied. Efforts by Kirchberg to obtain injunctions regarding YouPorn from internet providers in Kiel and Düsseldorf were unsuccessful.

Singapore
In May 2008 it was reported that Singapore had blocked access to YouPorn and RedTube, in what a government officials described as "a symbolic statement".

Sri Lanka
In July 2009 Sri Lanka blocked access to 12 porn web sites including YouPorn, RedTube, Xvideos and Xhamster. On July 25, 2009 Sri Lanka Chief Magistrate Nishantha Hapuarachchi ordered the Telecommunications Regulatory Commission to block those 12 websites from all local Internet Service Providers.

India
The Government of India banned YouPorn in 2018, among other porn websites, after a Uttarakhand High Court court order demanding the same in a rape case where the perpetrators stated they were motivated to do so after watching online pornography.

Team YP
YouPorn sponsors an esports team known as Team YP. In July 2014, YouPorn stated their intentions to enter the professional esports scene by sponsoring either a Dota 2 or League of Legends team. On December 3, 2014, YouPorn announced their official entry into the Dota 2 scene with the acquisition of a Spanish team previously known as Play2Win. On June 9, 2015 Team YP announced that they had signed Super Smash Bros. player Jason "Bizzarro Flame" Yoon. Team YP's Street Fighter division consists of Valentin "Valmaster" Petit and Anton "Filipin0man" Herrera with the former being signed on September 23 and the latter being signed on October 8. In October 2015, Team YP announced they were searching for a Counter-Strike: Global Offensive team. They stated they wanted one all-male and one all-female team.

See also

Comparison of video services
Internet pornography
List of video hosting services
Porn 2.0

References

MindGeek
American erotica and pornography websites
Gratis pornography
Cypriot erotica and pornography websites
Internet properties established in 2006
Pornhub Network
Pornography in Los Angeles
Video hosting
Video on demand services
Internet censorship in India